La Vista High School is a continuation high school located in Fullerton, California. As such, it is a high school for 16–18-year-old Fullerton Joint Union High School District students who, in most cases, have not made satisfactory progress toward graduation at one of the six comprehensive high schools in the district. Students are usually referred to La Vista High School by one of the traditional high schools because they are short on credits in required courses to graduate. The continuation school shares the same campus as Troy High School.

Notable alumni
 Rikk Agnew, musician
 Kevin McNiff, executive
 Walid LBELLALI, aerospace engineer

References

Schools in Orange County, California
Education in Fullerton, California